James Harden-Hickey (born James Aloysius Harden, December 8, 1854 – February 9, 1898) was a Franco-American author, newspaper editor, duellist, adventurer and self-proclaimed Prince of Trinidad, reigning as James I.

Early life
James Aloysius Harden was born in San Francisco on December 8, 1854. To avoid the violent city still in the madness of the gold rush, James' French mother took him to live in Paris, which was then an Empire under the rule of Napoleon III. The nephew of Napoleon I left his mark on James by making France a wild, flamboyant stage for ornate theatrical displays and public works, and mystifying ceremonies. As a child, James was fascinated with the French court and all of its glamor and pomp. Also, because of the lively brilliance of the live theater, he acquired a lifelong liking of adventure. During boyhood he was taught in Belgium by the Jesuits and later studied law at the University of Leipzig. He entered the French military academy, Saint-Cyr, at 19. In 1875, he graduated with high marks.

Shortly thereafter, his father died. Three years later, Harden-Hickey married the Countess de Saint-Pery and fathered two children. By then he had mastered French, was accounted a master swordsman and began writing novels.

Literary career
On November 10, 1878, Harden-Hickey first published the newspaper Triboulet, named for a jester of King Louis XII, eight years after Napoleon's fall from power. Though popular, the strongly anti-republican stand of this paper involved Harden-Hickey in no fewer than a dozen duels, several dozen lawsuits and numerous fines. Sadly for Harden-Hickey and his fellow royalists, their funds were exhausted by 1887.

As of 1880, he had 11 novels published. Two of the novels are borrowed from Michael Strogoff by Jules Verne and another is based on Don Quixote by Miguel de Cervantes Saavedra. His novels praise the virtues of monarchies and are anti-democratic. James was made a baron of the Holy Roman Empire (which legally ceased to exist in 1806) for his strong defense of the church in his works and in practice.

His novels include the following, all published under the pen name Saint Patrice:

Un Amour Vendeen
Lettres d'un Yankee
Merveilleuses Adventures de Nabuchodonosor Nosebreaker
Un Amour dans le Monde
Memoirs d'un Gommeux

Sometime after, James Harden-Hickey divorced his first wife and renounced Catholicism; he acquired an interest in Buddhism and Theosophy. This was a turning point in his life, and he took the opportunity to travel around the world, staying a year in India, learning Sanskrit and studying the philosophy of the Buddha. He returned to Paris and met Annie Harper Flagler, daughter of John Haldane Flagler, head of a successful pipe company and one of Andrew Carnegie's partners in the steel business. They were married at the Fifth Avenue Presbyterian Church in New York on March 17 (St. Patrick's Day), 1891. He lived with and off the Flaglers in New York for two years.

Traveling to Tibet before his marriage, his crew made a stop in the South Atlantic. Harden-Hickey noticed that the tiny island of Trinidad in the South Atlantic Ocean had never been claimed by any country and was, legally, "res nullius".  He claimed the island and proclaimed himself James I, Prince of Trinidad. He wanted an independent state with himself as military dictator, and later in 1893, he got just that.

As Prince James I of Trinidad
The now-James I was given attention – most of it negative and derogatory – by various nations and news organizations when he started selling Principality of Trinidad government bonds, opened an office in New York City and began making secretarial appointments, such as M. le Comte de la Boissiere as his Secretary of State.

Trinidad was seized by Great Britain, however, in 1895 as a telegraph cable-relay station, and James I was forced to surrender it to them, leaving him with only a homemade crown, and a schooner. While the Brazilians and British were threatening war over their respective claims, James I was forgotten, although he had the prior claim of sovereignty. Appeals to the United States to act as a mediator did nothing for his cause when US Secretary of State John Milton Hay released his letter appealing for American mediation to the press, opening James I to harsh ridicule in the popular press.

After the British invaded "his" Trinidad island in 1895, James I designed a plan to invade England from Ireland and even asked the wealthy Henry Flagler to finance his invasion plan, but Flagler demured, and denied his request. James I then tried to raise money by selling his ranch in Mexico but failed to assemble enough funds to continue operating.

Although somewhat apocryphal, there is evidence to suggest that during this time, James I was approached by a certain filibuster named Ralston J. Markowe with a plan in 1895 to make him the King of Hawai'i (per Richard Harding Davis, but any such plans as may have existed never came to fruition.)

Later years
Over the next two years, Harden-Hickey fell into deep depression. His vision for his island was easily realizable, and it had become the core of his existence, but, despite the validity of his claim on Trinidad and his seriousness at realizing his dream, he received little real support, only receiving such from his family and friends; and after all of his attempts at restoring his claim had failed, the world laughed at him for even trying. In truth, his only public support came from the New York Times, which gave him some praise and compassion. He gave the managing editor and a reporter for the Times the Order of Trinidad for their understanding of his passion.

James Harden-Hickey had written a book titled Euthanasia: The Aesthetics of Suicide, showing that suicide was a powerful art form and "a privilege." He wrote that life wasn't so important or even worth living if one was to suffer, and stated clearly that "it is of greater moment to live well than to live long, and that often it is living well not to live long." Destitute and depressed, he lived up to his ideology by living and dying as a strong proponent of suicide: Harden-Hickey took an overdose of morphine on February 9, 1898, in an El Paso, Texas hotel when he could not sell his Mexican ranch that he acquired while living with the Flaglers. Found among his effects were a suicide note to his wife and his memorabilia from his glory days with him, including his hand-made crown.

References

External links
, by Richard Harding Davis from Project Gutenberg. A biographical sketch of Harden-Hickey published in 1906.

Writers from San Francisco
Micronational leaders
1858 births
1898 deaths
Heads of state of former countries
Heads of state of states with limited recognition
American people of French descent
École Spéciale Militaire de Saint-Cyr alumni
19th-century monarchs in South America
Drug-related suicides in Texas
American expatriates in France
American writers in French
19th-century American writers
1890s suicides
Self-proclaimed monarchy